The 2005 Budweiser Shootout was the first exhibition stock car race of the 2005 NASCAR Nextel Cup Series season and the 27th iteration of the event. The race was held on Saturday, February 12, 2005, in Daytona Beach, Florida, at Daytona International Speedway, a 2.5 miles (4.0 km) permanent triangular-shaped superspeedway, before a crowd of 120,000. The race took the scheduled 70 laps to complete. In an action-packed race, Jimmie Johnson of Hendrick Motorsports would take the lead on lap 55 and hold off the field to win his first Budweiser Shootout. To fill out the podium, Ryan Newman of Penske Racing and Jeff Gordon of Hendrick Motorsports would finish second and third, respectively.

Background

Format and eligibility 
The race was broken up into two segments: a 20-lap segment, followed by a ten-minute intermission, concluding with a 50-lap second segment. While a pit stop was no longer required by rule, a reduction in fuel cell size (from 22 gallons to 13.5 gallons) made a fuel stop necessary. (In 2007, fuel cells were expanded to 18.5 gallons.) Many drivers also changed two tires during their fuel stop, as the time required to fuel the car allowed for a two-tire change without additional delay.

Pole winners of the previous season were automatically eligible for the race. Then, previous winners who had not already qualified would receive automatic births.

Entry list 

*Terry Labonte would decide to withdraw from the race, as he was still angry at NASCAR's actions at the 2004 Budweiser Shootout. Labonte had stated that NASCAR said that cars were not allowed to pit, but near the end of the race, cars were allowed to pit. Labonte would not pit and finish eighth. According to Labonte, "What happened last year is the reason I'm not in it this year."

Starting lineup 
The starting lineup was determined by a blind draw. Dale Jarrett of Robert Yates Racing would draw the pole for the race.

*Withdrew.

Race results

References 

2005 NASCAR Nextel Cup Series
NASCAR races at Daytona International Speedway
February 2005 sports events in the United States
2005 in sports in Florida